Thomas Morris (January 3, 1776December 7, 1844) was an American politician from Ohio who served in the United States Senate and was a member of the Democratic Party. In the 1844 presidential election, he was the vice presidential nominee of the anti-slavery Liberty Party.

Biography
Morris was born in Berks County, Pennsylvania, and enlisted as a Ranger to fight the Indians in 1793. He settled in western Ohio two years later. Morris began practicing law in Bethel, Ohio in 1804.

Career
On May 12, 1806, shortly after the beginning of the 1806–1807 term of the Ohio House of Representatives, Morris contested the election of David C. Bryan and was awarded the seat from Clermont County.

Morris served in the Ohio State House of Representatives  for Clermont County from 1806–1807, 1808–1809, 1810–1811, and 1820–1821.) He served as Justice of the Ohio State Supreme Court in 1809. He was then a member of the Ohio State Senate for Clermont County from 1813–1815, 1821–1823, 1825–1829 and 1831–1833.

He was elected to the U.S. Senate in 1833, and served a single term. He did not seek re-election. He was nominated to the Vice Presidency by the Liberty Party in 1844 under James G. Birney. The ticket came in third after Democratic candidate James Knox Polk and Whig Party candidate Henry Clay.

Family life
Morris was the father of Isaac Newton Morris and Jonathan David Morris.

Death
He died December 7, 1844 and is interred in Early Settlers Burial Ground, Bethel, Clermont County, Ohio USA.

Legacy 
Author and prominent American Civil War historian Eric Foner argues in his seminal book Free Soil, Free Labor, Free Men that Sen. Morris is one of the most significant figures in the anti-slavery movement and the "first political martyr of the anti-slavery cause when he was denied re-election to the Senate because of his abolitionist convictions." He also argues that Morris "awakened (Salmon Chase) to the character of the Slave Power and to the need for political organization to combat its influences," leading the way for the term Slave Power to enter the American political jargon and paving the way for the creation of the Republican Party.

Quotes
 "Who taught me to hate slavery and every other oppression?  Jefferson, the great and good Jefferson!  Yes, Virginia Senators, it was your own Jefferson, Virginia's favorite son, who did more for the natural liberty of mankind, and the civil liberty of his country, than any man who ever lived in our country - and it was he who taught me to hate slavery; it was in his school I was brought up.  If I am, sir, an Abolitionist, Jefferson made me one; and I only regret that the disciple should be so far behind the master both in doctrine and in practice."

Further reading
Benjamin Franklin Morris, The Life of Thomas Morris: Pioneer and Long a Legislator of Ohio, and U. S. Senator from 1833 to 1839 (Cincinnati, Ohio: Moore, Wilstach, Keys & Overend, 1956).

References

External links

 
 Benjamin Franklin Morris, The Life of Thomas Morris: Pioneer and Long a Legislator of Ohio, and U. S. Senator from 1833 to 1839 (Cincinnati, Ohio: Moore, Wilstach, Keys & Overend, 1856).

|-

|-

|-

|-

|-

|-

|-

|-

|-

1776 births
1844 deaths
People from Berks County, Pennsylvania
Ohio Democratic-Republicans
Ohio Jacksonians
Jacksonian United States senators from Ohio
Democratic Party United States senators from Ohio
Ohio Libertyites
Liberty Party (United States, 1840) vice presidential nominees
1844 United States vice-presidential candidates
Democratic Party members of the Ohio House of Representatives
Democratic Party Ohio state senators
Justices of the Ohio Supreme Court
People from Bethel, Ohio